Michael Bruce Crockart (born 19 March 1966) is a Scottish Liberal Democrat politician. He was the Member of Parliament (MP) for Edinburgh West from 2010 to 2015.

Crockart was the Parliamentary Private Secretary (PPS) to Michael Moore, the Scottish Secretary of State, but he quit in December 2010 to vote against the rise in tuition fees.

Parliamentary candidate
Crockart was educated at Perth High School and at Edinburgh University where he studied Social Sciences. He worked as a policeman with Lothian and Borders Police for eight years before becoming a systems developer with Standard Life. He first challenged for elected office in 2002 when he came second in a by-election for the Balerno ward of the City of Edinburgh Council, coming second to the Conservatives. He stood for the same ward again the following year, increasing his share of the vote.

Edinburgh North and Leith
In 2005 he stood for the Westminster constituency of Edinburgh North and Leith, coming second to Labour's Mark Lazarowicz and securing a swing of 8.3 per cent from Labour to Lib Dem. In November 2005 he again sought election to the city council, standing in another by-election in Murrayfield, and again came second. In the 2007 Scottish Parliament elections in the smaller Scottish constituency of Edinburgh North and Leith, and again secured a large swing from Labour but still finished in second place.

Edinburgh West
In 2009, John Barrett, the Liberal Democrat MP for Edinburgh West announced his retirement, prompting a nomination fight. Crockart stood, as did city council housing leader Paul Edie, former Borders MSP Euan Robson and former Edinburgh Central Scottish Parliament candidate Siobhan Mathers. Crockart defeated Edie by 77 votes to 57. He retained the seat for the party in the 2010 general election with an 8.2 per cent majority, despite suffering a large swing to the Labour Party of 11.4.

Member of Parliament
The result from the 2010 election produced a situation whereby no one party had a majority in the House of Commons and so a coalition agreement was drawn up between the Conservatives and the Liberal Democrats. As a result, Crockart, in his first term as an MP, was now sitting on the Government benches as opposed to the opposition ones. Speaking about the agreement, Crockart claimed that this was a "bold and ambitious agreement" that would bring "positive change to Edinburgh". Crockart was appointed the Parliamentary Private Secretary (PPS) to the Scottish Secretary Michael Moore.

On 9 December 2010, Crockart resigned as Michael Moore's PPS to vote against the government's proposed rise in tuition fees. In his resignation letter, he told party chief whip Alistair Carmichael that the rise in potential student debt will "seriously impact on people's choices". He went on to say, "this is especially true for those students from poorer backgrounds, many of whom have no role models in their schools or families to demonstrate to them the benefits which can accrue from a university education."

During the 2015 general election campaign, Crockart criticised the Scottish National Party for issuing campaign letters referring to him as the "retiring MP". At the election, he lost his seat to SNP cadidate Michelle Thomson.

References

External links
 West Edinburgh Liberal Democrats
 

1966 births
Living people
People from Perth, Scotland
Alumni of the University of Edinburgh
Scottish police officers
Scottish Liberal Democrat MPs
UK MPs 2010–2015
Members of the Parliament of the United Kingdom for Edinburgh constituencies
Officers in Scottish police forces